Rajani (born Shashi Kaur Malhotra; 27 July 1965) is an Indian actress known for her work in Telugu, Tamil, Kannada, and Malayalam films.

She has worked in 150 feature films including Rendu Rellu Aaru (1986), Seetharama Kalyanam (1986), Aha Naa Pellanta (1987), Majnu (1987). She also starred in Kannada films including Jai Karnataka (1989), a remake of the 1987 Hindi film Mr. India and Neenu Nakkare Haalu Sakkare (1991). She then starred in Bharathan's Malayalam hit Padheyam (1993). In Tamil films, she was credited as Sasikala.

Personal life
She was married to Dr. Mullagiri Praveen in 1998; they have 3 children.

Filmography

Telugu

 Brahma Mudi (1985)
 Adapadachu (1985)
 Bharyabhartala Bandham (1985)
 Lanchavataram (1985)
 Idena Nyayam (1985)
 Pelli Miku Akshtintalu Maku (1985)
 Naga Devatha (1986)
 Brahma Rudrulu (1986)
 Seetarama Kalyanam (1986)
 Manavudu Danavudu (1986)
 Manchi Manasulu (1986)
 Rendu Rella Aaru (1986)
 Pratidwani (1986)
 Cowboy No. 1 (1986)
 Maruti (1986)
 Majnu (1987)
 Thayaramma Thandava Krishna (1987)
 Nene Raju Nene Mantri (1987)
 Collector Gari Abbai (1987)
 Agni Putrudu (1987)
 Bhale Mogudu (1987)
 Thayarama Thandava Krishna (1987)
 Maonagadu (1987)
 Udayam (1987)
 Gundamma Gari Krishnulu (1987)
 Ramu (1987)
 Sardar Dharmanna (1987)
 Donga Kapuram (1987)
 Muddu Bidda (1987)
 Chinnari Devatha (1987)
 Sahasa Putrudu (1987)
 Hantakudi Veta (1987)
 Nammina Bantu (1987)
 Aha Naa Pellanta (1987)
 Brahma Putrudu (1987)
 Shankaravam (1988)
 Ugranetrudu (1988)
 Samsaram (1988)
 Jeevana Ganga (1988)
 Chalaki Mogudu Chadastapu Pellam (1988)
 Bhama Kalapam (1988)
 Murali Krishnudu (1988)
 Chikkadu Dorakadu (1988)
 Gaduggai (1989)
 Bandhuvulostunnaru Jagratha (1989)
 Dhruva Nakshatram (1990)
 Prananiki Pranam (1990)
 Prananiki Teyvi (1990)

Tamil

 Ilamai Kaalangal (1983) – Debut in Tamil
 Sabaash (1984)
 Kadamai (1984)
 Shankari (1984)
 Kuzhandai Yesu (1984)
 Madras Vaathiyaar (1984)
 Theerpu En Kaiyil (1984)
 Kaval Kaithigal (1984)
 Sattathai Thiruthungal (1984)
 Kuva Kuva Vaathugal (1984)
 Theerpugal Thirutthapadalaam (1985)
 Anbin Mugavari (1985)
 Naagam (1985)
 Enaitha Kodugal (1985)
 Navagraha Nayagi (1985)
 Thanga Mama 3D (1985)
 Ilankandru (1985)
 Sigappu Nila (1985)
 Oomai Vizhigal (1986)
 Kutravaaligal (1986)
 Kolusu (1986)
 Mann Soru (1986)
 Shankar Guru (1987)
 Inaindha Kaigal (1990)
 Vetri Vizha (1989)
 Gnana Paravai (1990)
 En Pottukku Sonthakkaran (1991)
 Naane Varuven (1992)
 Unna Nenachen Pattu Padichen (1992)
 Oor Mariyadhai (1992)

Kannada
 Jai Karnataka (1989)
 Mathsara (1991)
 Nagini (1990)
 Neenu Nakkare Haalu Sakkare (1991)
 Entede Bhanta (1992)
 Preethi Maado Hudugarigella earlier Sundara Loka (2002)

Malayalam
 Inakkily (1984) or (1985)
 Padheyam (1993)

References

External links

1965 births
1975 births
Living people
Punjabi people
Actresses in Telugu cinema
Actresses in Malayalam cinema
Actresses in Kannada cinema
Actresses in Tamil cinema
Indian film actresses
20th-century Indian actresses
Actresses from Bangalore